A meshulach (plural: meshulachim), also known as a shaliach or SHaDaR (acronym for ), was an emissary sent to the Diaspora to raise funds (ḥalukka) for the Jewish communities of the Land of Israel. In recent times, the term has come to mean any charity collector for a Jewish organization.

Role of the meshulach
Often an individual meshulach may operate as an independent contractor for several different organizations, taking a portion of the proceeds as profit.  The percentage retained by the meshulach is sometimes as high as 49%.

In response to the public perception of fraudulent meshulachim, some communities (for example, Baltimore) have appointed rabbis or panels to investigate meshulachim and issue them certificates to attest for the validity of their cause.

Notable meshulachim
 1441. Esrim ve-Arba‘ah: Europe
 1587. Joseph ben Moses Miṭrani the Elder (or di Ṭrani, 1569–1639): Egypt
 1598–1599. Joseph ben Moses Miṭrani the Elder (or di Ṭrani, 1569–1639): Istanbul (first mission)
 1600. Judah de Leon: Italy
 1600s–1606. Joseph ben Moses Miṭrani the Elder (or di Ṭrani, 1569–1639): Istanbul (second mission)
 1650. Nathan ben Reuben David Spiro: Italy and Germany
 1659. Benjamin ha-Levi: the Levant and Italy
 1670s. Judah Sharaf: Livorno, Italy
 1676. Joseph ben Eliezer: Italy and Germany
 1676. Joseph Shalit Riqueti: Italy and Germany (with the preceding, author of Iggeret Mesapperet)
 1688–1692. Ḥezekiah ben David da Silva (1656–1697): Western Europe (including Amsterdam)
 1690. Judah Sharaf: the Levant and Italy
 1695. Avraham Yitzchaḳi: Italy
 1695. Shmuel ha-Kohen: Italy, etc.
 1695. Abraham ben Levi Conque: Italy, Germany, and Poland
 1700. Hayyim Asael ben Benjamin: Smyrna
 1705. Gedaliah Hayyim: Italy
 1709. Nathan Mannheim: Germany and Poland
 1709. Jacob of Vilna: Germany and Poland (with the preceding, author of Me’orot Natan)
 1710. David Melammed
 1712. Hayyim Hazzan
 1712. Abraham Rovigo
 1718. Hayyim Jacob ben Jacob David: the Levant and Europe
 1720. Ephraim ben Aaron Nabon: Italy
 1730. David Capsoto: Holland
 1730. Moses Hagiz: the Levant and Europe for a period of 50 years
 1740. Baruch Gad: Media and Persia
 1740s–1749. Ḥayyim ben Elias Moda‘i
 1750. Baruch of Austria
 1750. Hayyim Joseph David Azulai (1724–1806): the Levant and Europe (including Egypt, Amsterdam, England, and Livorno, for 56 years. His Ma‘agal Yashar contains part of his itinerary)
 1750. Hayyim Abraham Tzebi: Italy
 1750. Hayyim Mordecai Tzebi: Italy, etc.
 1750. Rahmim Nissim Mizrahi: the Levant and Italy
 1759. Moses Malki: America
 1760. Hayyim Nissim Jeroham of Vilna: Germany
 1760. Yom-Ṭob al-Ghazi: the Levant and Italy
 1760s. Ḥayyim ben Elias Moda‘i (1720–1794): Holland (wrote approbation to Pe’er ha-Dor) and elsewhere in Europe
 1765. Jacob al-Yashar: Persia
 1767. Issachar Abulafia: Italy (wrote approbation to Yad Mal’akhi)
 1770. Abraham Solomon Zalmon: Europe
 1772. Abraham Segre: Germany
 1773. Raphael Chayyim Isaac Carregal: West Indies and the British Colonies of North America
 1776. Jacob Raphael Saraval: Holland and England
 1780. Judah Samuel Ashkenazi
 1783. Abraham ha-Kohen of Lask: Germany and Poland
 1790. David Hayyim Hazzan: Italy
 1793. Yosef Maimon: Bukhara
 1796. Joseph Aben Samon: Tripoli (wrote approbation to Ḥayyey Abraham)
 1800. Israel of Shklov: Lithuania and Belarus
 1804. Israel Raphael Segre
 1807. Hayyim Baruch of Austria: Germany (wrote approbation to Otsar ha-Ḥayyim)
 1810. Solomon David Hazzan: the Levant and Italy
 1830. Joseph Edels Ashkenazi: Italy
 1848. Isaac Kovo: Egypt
 1848. Jacob Saphir: Southern countries (first mission)
 1850. Isaac Farhi: Italy
 1850. Levi Nehemias: Italy
 1850. Joseph Schwarz: the United States (author of Ṭevu’at ha-Arets)
 1854. Jacob Saphir: Yemen, British India, Egypt, and Australia (Second mission)
 1856. Moses Hazzan: the Levant (author of Naḥalah le-Yisra’el)
 1865. Raphael Meir Panigel: Europe (haham başı and author of Lev Marpe’)
 1870. Moses Pardo: North Africa
 1885. Moses Riwlin: Australia
 1885. Nathan Natkin: the United States (d. 1888, in New York)
 1890. Abraham ibn Ephraim: Persia (Sephardic)
 1894. Yosef Haim HaCohen: Saudi Arabia, Uzbekistan and Caucasus Mountains
 1899. Yosef Haim HaCohen: Bukhara.
 1903 (then serving):
 Shalom Hamadi: Yemen (Sephardic)
 Benjamin ha-Kohen: Caucasus, Russia (Sephardic)
 J. Meynhas: India (Sephardic)
 Eliezer Zalman Grajewski: the United States
 Joshua Loeb Suessenwein: the United States (author of Tsir Ne’eman, Jerusalem, 1898)
 Solomon Joseph Eliach
 Yosef Haim HaCohen: Algiers, Constantine, Algeria
 1934. Amram Aburbeh: Morocco.

Notes

References

Jewish religious occupations
Jews and Judaism in Ottoman Palestine
Hebrew words and phrases
Jews and Judaism in Ottoman Galilee